Queenstown Hill, also known by its Māori name of Te Tapu-nui (mountain of intense sacredness), is a small  mountain near Queenstown, New Zealand in the South Island.

The lower levels of the hill contain housing especially near Queenstown, Frankton Road and Marina Heights. Midway up the hill is a large forest of mainly douglas fir and larch, while the top is largely clear and the ground cover is that of tussock and native vegetation.

Queenstown Hill is also home to a farm consisting of 1800 sheep which is owned and operated by the Middletons who purchased the lease in 1963 and freeholded the land in 1978. The Queenstown Hill Time Walk is part of the land owned by the Middletons.

Queenstown Hill Time Walk
The Time Walk is a walk on the Queenstown Hill that was created to mark the Millennium in the year 2000.
The entrance to the trail is on Belfast Terrace. At the start of the walk is a wrought iron gate which shows symbols of the local area.
There are many panels along the walk describing the history of the area.
The walk takes about three hours return, but can be shortened by not walking the full loop. 
This walking track is not allowed to be used by bikes. Dogs are allowed halfway up the track until the private land boundary, but must be leashed at all times.

Basket of Dreams
Not far from the top is a sculpture called the Basket of Dreams by Caroline Robinson. There are expansive views from this point of the whole basin including Lake Wakatipu, Cecil Peak and The Remarkables.

References

Queenstown-Lakes District
Mountains of Otago